James Lyon may refer to:

 James E. Lyon (1927–1993), American businessman and Texas Republican politician
 James Lyon, 7th Earl of Strathmore and Kinghorne (c. 1702–1735)
 James Lyon (composer) (1735–1794), early American music composer
 Sir James Frederick Lyon (1775–1842), British Army officer and Governor of Barbados, 1829–33
 James R. Lyon (1833–?), American merchant and soldier, Wisconsin Republican politician
 James M. Lyon, American computer programmer, co-author of the INTERCAL programming language
 Jimmy Lyon (born 1955), American musician

See also
 James Lyons (disambiguation)